Carolyn Wonderland (born Carolyn Bradford, November 9, 1972) is an American blues singer-songwriter and musician. She is married to comedian and writer A. Whitney Brown.

Early life and education
Carolyn Wonderland was born Carolyn Bradford in 1972 in Houston, Texas, United States. Wonderland dropped out of Houston's Langham Creek High School to pursue her music ambitions.

Career
In 1999, Wonderland moved to Austin, Texas; in 2001, she lost her apartment lease after her landlord became ill, and decided to live out of her van since she was spending more than 300 days a year on the road performing.

Wonderland's instrumental abilities include guitar, slide guitar, mandolin, trumpet, and piano.  Although primarily a blues artist, Wonderland likes to incorporate elements of country, swing, zydeco, surf, gospel, soul, and cumbia into her musical mix.  She usually performs with Cole El-Saleh on keyboards and Kevin Lance on drums.

In February 2008, Wonderland released the CD, Miss Understood, on the Bismeaux Productions label, and the title song has been on the Top 50 of the 'Roots Music Report' chart since the album's release. Fans of Wonderland's music include Bob Dylan, and Ray Benson, founder of Asleep at the Wheel. Benson produced Miss Understood, and has been one of her songwriting collaborators. Wonderland credits several blues and Texas musicians as influences on her music. One notable influence is Austin singer-songwriter Terri Hendrix, as Wonderland covered two Hendrix songs, ("I Found the Lions"  and "Throw My Love"), on Miss Understood.

Wonderland has been involved in a number of recordings, including several that were self-produced on independent labels. She was the lead singer fronting the band Imperial Monkeys.  Wonderland released Bloodless Revolution in 2008, and is the primary singer on the Jerry Lightfoot's Band of Wonder Texistentialism CD with Lightfoot and Vince Welnick (Grateful Dead, Tubes.)

Wonderland was a founding member of the Loose Affiliation of Saints and Sinners (with Papa Mali, Eldridge Goins, Guy Forsyth, and others), with several of her songs being featured on their Sessions from the Hotel San Jose Rm. 50 CD. She was also the lead guitarist in the all-girl, southern rock band Sis DeVille (other members include Shelley King, Sarah Brown, Lisa Pankratz, and Floramay Holliday), and a founding member of the Austin Volunteer Orchestra.

Wonderland appeared on Austin City Limits in 2008, and has had her music used on NBC's Homicide and Fox's Time of Your Life.  She was a headlining artist at the annual Rochester International Jazz Festival summer 2009 at the Eastman Theatre and New York. In 2003, Wonderland opened the Sturgis Motorcycle Rally, after performing there for the previous ten years, singing the National Anthem with 'The Imperial Monkeys'.

Wonderland also performs with the Imperial Golden Crown Harmonizers, raising money for local Austin charities, food banks, soup kitchens, homeless shelters, and on behalf of the legalization of marijuana.

On April 6, 2018, Wonderland joined John Mayall's band as his first female lead guitarist in his 60+ year career.

Personal life
Wonderland married writer-comedian A. Whitney Brown on March 4, 2011, in a ceremony officiated by Michael Nesmith.

Recognition
Wonderland has won the following awards:
Best Blues Band – 1996 Public News Music Awards
Best Rock/Pop Album of the Year ("Bursting With Flavor") and Local Musician of the Year and Best Female Vocalist – 1997 Houston Press Music Awards
Local Musician of the Year & song of the Year ("Blue Lights") – 1998 Houston Press Music Awards
Best Blues Songwriter of the Year – 1999 Houston Press Music Awards
Gold Award – Flagstaff International Film Festival – Music Video Awards – Alan Ames & Assoc. "Party on Houston" featured artist 'Carolyn Wonderland'
Best Female Vocalist – 2000 Houston Press Music Awards
Best Blues Band – 2009 Austin Music Awards
Best Female Vocalist – 2009 Austin Music Awards
Best Female Vocalist – 2012 Austin Music Awards

Discography

Albums

Collaborations
Drink the Rain (2001) (indie release) Rebecca Cole with Wonderland
Texistentialism (2001) Noah's Sky Music (indie release) with 'Jerry Lightfoot's Band of Wonder featuring Vince Welnick'
Sessions From the Hotel San Jose, Rm. 50 (2002) (Mix-O-Rama) with 'A Loose Affiliation of Saints and Sinners'
Fireside Songs For the Soul (2010) (licensed by Bismeaux) Wonderland and Guy Forsyth
Nobody Told Me (2019) (Forty Below) John Mayall
The Sun Is Shining Down (2022) (Forty Below) John Mayall

See also

 Music of Austin

References

External links
Official website

1972 births
Living people
American blues guitarists
American blues singers
American women singer-songwriters
American blues singer-songwriters
Musicians from Austin, Texas
Musicians from Houston
Singer-songwriters from Texas
Guitarists from Texas
21st-century American women singers
21st-century American women guitarists
21st-century American guitarists
American expatriates in England
21st-century American singers